Michael V. Capps or Mike Capps is an American video game designer who was the president of Epic Games, based in Cary, North Carolina from 2002 to 2012. In 2018, he co-founded a new artificial intelligence company called Diveplane Corporation. He has been described as "a legendary figure in the video game industry."

Early life 
Capps attended the University of North Carolina at Chapel Hill, graduating summa cum laude with degrees in math and creative writing in 1994.  He also earned his MS in computer science from the University of North Carolina at Chapel Hill in 1996. 

Capps then went on to complete an SM in computer science and electrical engineering from the Massachusetts Institute of Technology in 1998, followed by a Ph.D. in computer science from the Naval Postgraduate School in 2002.

Career

Naval Postgraduate School 
Before entering the game industry, Capps served as a research assistant professor at the Naval Postgraduate School in Monterey, California from 1998 to 2002. His areas of specialization were computer graphics, defense and entertainment collaboration, and virtual reality. For his work in these areas, he was one of fifty graphics pioneers interviewed for the ACM SIGGRAPH documentary The Story of Computer Graphics.

Capps was selected by the Army's Office of Economic and Manpower Analysis (OEMA) to head its development team that was charged with designing a fun military video game. He became the producer, designer and lead programmer of the America’s Army computer game. He used Epic's Games' Unreal Engine to build the game.

Scion Studios 
In 2002, Capps founded a video game company, Scion Studios, and became its CEO. Scion was acquired by Epic Games in March 2004.

Epic Games 
Capps has been a game designer, executive producer, head writer, lead programmer, research professor, and studio executive. He is best known for his decade as the president of Epic Games, makers of the mega-hit Gears of War, Infinity Blade, Fortnite franchises, and the award-winning Unreal Engine. Under his leadership, Epic was named Studio of the Year at the 2006 Spike Video Game Awards, the North Carolina Technology Association 2007 Large Company of the Year, and the NCTA 2008 Top Industry Driven Technology Company of the Year. In addition, Gears of War won the Best Game and the Technology Award at Game Developers Choice Awards in 2007.

Capps also successfully defended video games using free speech before the U.S. Supreme Court. He stepped down from the post of president in December 2012.

Autarch 
Capps is co-owner of Autarch LLC, responsible for award-winning tabletop role-playing games, such as Adventurer Conqueror King.

Diveplane 
In 2018, Capps co-founded and became the CEO of Diveplane Corporation, an artificial intelligence start-up company based in Raleigh, North Carolina, along with Dr. Chris Hazard and Mike Resnick. Diveplane has eighteen employees and is backed by $3.5 million. It is working the areas of healthcare and NASCAR racing simulation. In 2019, Diveplane won first place at the UBS Future of Finance Challenge for its platform, GEMENAI.

Television appearances 
Capps is the technology futurist for the Science Channel's What on Earth?, Combat Countdown, and NASA's The Unexplained Files. He has also  been featured as a technology expert and futurist on multiple documentary series on the Discovery Channel and Military Channel.

Awards 

 2007 Game Developers Choice Awards Best Game for Gears of War 
 2007 Game Developers Choice Awards Technology for Gears of War 
 2009 Technology Executive of the Year, North Carolina Technology Association 
 2012 CEO of the Year, WRAL Tech Wire Full Steam Ahead Awards
 2012 Ernst & Young Entrepreneur of the Year finalist.
 2016, Beacon Award for Lifetime Achievement, North Carolina Technology Association 
 Game Developer 50, Game Developer

Professional affiliations 
Capps currently serves on the board of the Sphero entertainment robotics company in Colorado and is the chairman of the advisory board for the Lonerider Brewing Company. He also serves on the board of Epic Games. He also served as an advisor to the Game Developers Conference and the Video Games track. He was a member of the North Carolina Innovation Council. He is a frequent speaker at Dragon Con.

He served on the boards of the Academy of Interactive Arts & Sciences, the Entertainment Software Association, the Game Developers Conference, International Game Developers Association, and Remedy Entertainment in Finland. He was the Treasurer for the Board of the IGDA and was a member of the Entertainment Software Review Board.

Personal life 
Capps became a stay-at-home father when his two children were born. He returned to work as his children became  He is a member of Change the Equation. He also serves on the board of The Raleigh School.

Projects

Video games

Design 
 America's Army: Operations (Epic Games, 2002)
 Unreal Championship 2: The Liandri Conflict (Epic Games, 2005)

Producer 
 America's Army: Operations (2002)
 Gears of War (Epic Games/Microsoft Game Studios, 2006)
 Gears of War Limited Collectors Edition (Epic Games/Microsoft Games Studios, 2006)
 Unreal Tournament 3 (Epic Games, 2007)
 Gears of War Ultimate Edition (Epic Games, 2015)

Programming and engineering 
 America's Army: Operations (2002)
 Unreal Tournament 2003 (Epic Games, 2003)
 Unreal Tournament 2004 (Epic Games, 2004)
 Unreal Championship 2: The Liandri Conflict (Epic Games, 2005)

Writer 

 Unreal Tournament 3 (Epic Games, 2007)

President 
 Gears of War 2 (Epic Games, 2008)
 Shadow Complex (Epic Games, 2009)

Infinity Blade (Epic Games, 2010) 
Infinity Blade II (Epic Games, 2011)
Gears of War 3 (Epic Games, 2011)
Bulletstorm (Epic Games, 2011)
Gears of War: Judgment (Epic Games 2013)

Tabletop games 
Marvel Multiverse Table Top Role Playing Game (Marvel, 2022)

Graphic novels 

 Gears of War: Volume Two. Wildstorm, 2011.

References

External links
Official website of Epic Games

Year of birth missing (living people)
Living people
University of North Carolina at Chapel Hill alumni
Massachusetts Institute of Technology alumni
Naval Postgraduate School alumni
Naval Postgraduate School faculty
Video game businesspeople
People from Raleigh, North Carolina
Video game developers
American video game designers